Mezőcsát is a district in southern part of Borsod-Abaúj-Zemplén County. Mezőcsát is also the name of the town where the district seat is found. The district is located in the Northern Hungary Statistical Region.

Geography 
Mezőcsát District borders with Miskolc District and Tiszaújváros District to the north, Hajdúnánás District and Balmazújváros District (Hajdú-Bihar County) to the east and south, Mezőkövesd District to the west. The number of the inhabited places in Mezőcsát District is 8.

Municipalities 
The district has 1 town and 7 villages.
(ordered by population, as of 1 January 2012)

The bolded municipality is the city.

Demographics

In 2011, it had a population of 14,446 and the population density was 41/km².

Ethnicity
Besides the Hungarian majority, the main minority is the Roma (approx. 1,500).

Total population (2011 census): 14,446
Ethnic groups (2011 census): Identified themselves: 14,393 persons:
Hungarians: 12,884 (89.52%)
Gypsies: 1,376 (9.56%)
Others and indefinable: 133 (0.92%)
Approx. 50 persons in Mezőcsát District did not declare their ethnic group at the 2011 census.

Religion
Religious adherence in the county according to 2011 census:

Reformed – 6,239;
Catholic – 3,764 (Roman Catholic – 3,625; Greek Catholic – 139); 
other religions – 211; 
Non-religious – 1,396; 
Atheism – 53;
Undeclared – 2,783.

Gallery

See also
List of cities and towns of Hungary

References

External links
 Postal codes of the Mezőcsát District

Districts in Borsod-Abaúj-Zemplén County